Heyy Babyy is a 2007 Indian Hindi-language comedy film produced by Sajid Nadiadwala and directed by Sajid Khan. It stars Akshay Kumar,  Fardeen Khan, Riteish Deshmukh, Vidya Balan, Juanna Sanghvi and Boman Irani.

The core storyline of this film is loosely based on the Malayalam film Thoovalsparsham (1990) which is an adaptation of the American film Three Men and a Baby (1987), in turn based on the French film Three Men and a Cradle.

Plot
Arush Mehra lives a fairly wealthy lifestyle in Sydney, Australia with roommates Tanmay Joglekar and Ali Haider. Arush works for a popular dance club, while Tanmay entertains children as 'Eddy Teddy', and Ali takes care of their apartment. He mostly watches cricket on the television and places bets on it. All three are womanizers and usually end up sleeping with different women. One day, they find a baby girl outside their door with a note instructing them to take care of her, since one of them is her father. The three men go to all the women they dated and slept with, but none claim the baby as theirs.

The men try to take care of the baby, but she becomes a huge pain. So, they drop her off at a house near a church. Then, they set off for a Christmas party. They are all thinking of the girl. A big rainstorm occurs, and the baby develops pneumonia after being left in the rain. The three men rush the baby to the hospital, realizing how much they love her, and regret their decisions. She recovers, and the three become changed men. They love her, pamper her, grow an attachment towards her and even apologize to all women they used. They name her Angel due to the miracle that she survived. One morning, a woman named Isha Sahni comes to take Angel back, claiming the baby to be her daughter. The guys are shocked as Arush tells them about his past.

One year ago, Arush traveled to Delhi to attend his cousin Arjun's wedding. There, he met Isha, who also resides in Australia. He put up a facade of being a guy with traditional Indian values, won her over and they spent the night together. Shortly after, Isha caught him in a compromising situation with Devika Sharma, Isha's friend, so the couple split up. It was not Arush's fault as Devika forced herself on top of him. Arush returned to Sydney and forgot about the incident.

The guys find it very difficult to live without Angel. Arush ends up challenging Isha to marry someone faithful within seven days who will accept Angel as a daughter. If she's unsuccessful, she will have to give Angel back to him. They sign a contract to finalize the deal. The men worry that they might lose the bet since Isha is beautiful and wealthy. Arush plans with Tanmay, Ali, and Bharat, who is Isha's father to keep Angel with him.

His first attempt involves Ali posing as a botany professor named Parimal Tripathi (inspired by Dharmendra's character from Chupke Chupke) who speaks very pure Hindi. Bharat is impressed by Parimal by this and Angel recognizes him as well. They manage to get through a few days of the week until one day Isha asks him about marriage the next day. After Isha says this, Ali talks to Arush and Tanmay who tells him to go to Disneyland where Ali gets Bharat attacked. He is stopped from further efforts by Tanmay in the 'Eddy Teddy' costume. Bharat decides that Tanmay is the right man for Isha. Tanmay, Arush, and Ali make plans to stop Isha from marrying someone else and tell the truth to Angel about their plans to convince her mother. As the contract is about to terminate, Isha somehow manages to find out the truth that she has been cheated by her father, Tanmay, Ali, and most of all Arush.

Isha goes with Angel to her private jet to go somewhere very far because she has lost the deal. As she is about to leave she is stopped by some cops because Ali and Tanmay called them. As they are arguing, Arush turns up showing Isha the contract and tearing it up indicating that Isha now has every right over Angel. But before the three men leave heartbroken, Arush says that a child needs a mother the most but it also needs a father. Just as they are about to leave, Angel says her first word "Dada" indicating she has developed an attachment to the men as well, but Isha takes her away in the airplane.

The three men are depressed as they assume that they may never see Angel again until they are surprised to see her on their doorstep. Isha finally realises that Angel needs her father too and the film ends with their marriage taking place, and Angel's photoshoot. During the wedding, Bharat's girlfriend crashes the wedding and questions Bharat about their relationship.

Cast
Akshay Kumar as Arush Mehra, Angel’s father, Isha’s husband, Al and Tanmay’s best friend
Fardeen Khan as Ali "Al" Haider/Professor Parimal Tripathi, Aarush and Tanmay’s best friend
Riteish Deshmukh as Tanmay Joglekar/Eddy Teddy, Aarush and Al’s best friend
Vidya Balan as Isha Sahni/Mehra, Angel’s mother and Aarush’s wife
Shah Rukh Khan as Raj Malhotra - Guest appearance in the song "Mast Kalandar” (second appearance of Shah Rukh Khan from Dilwale Dulhania Le Jayenge)
Anupam Kher as Mr. Malhotra - Guest appearance in the song "Mast Kalandar”
Boman Irani as Bharat Sahni, Isha’s father and Angel's maternal grandfather
Kim Sharma as Bharat's girlfriend and to be wife, Angel's maternal step grandmother
Aarti Chabria as Arush's ex-girlfriend
Payal Rohatgi as Tanmay's ex-girlfriend 
Hrishitaa Bhatt as Ali's ex-girlfriend
Sindhura Gadde as Devika Sharma
Chirag Vohra as Arjun 
Muskaan Mihani as Arjun's bride
Anupam Sharma as the doctor
Jennifer Mayani the supermarket girl
Vrajesh Hirjee as Ajay Shah, bridegroom of Devika Sharma
Bikramjeet Kanwarpal as Advocate Gautam Shah, Isha's lawyer
Juanna Sanghvi as Angel Mehra, Aarush and Isha’s daughter

Guest appearance in title song (in order of appearance)
 Malaika Arora
 Celina Jaitly
 Minissha Lamba
 Amrita Rao
 Tara Sharma
 Neha Dhupia
 Dia Mirza
 Ameesha Patel
 Sophie Choudry
 Masumeh Makhija
 Koena Mitra
 Riya Sen
 Amrita Arora
 Shamita Shetty

Production
Most of the shooting took place in Australia while some in Filmistan Studio in Mumbai.

An Australian features in a promotional video which was not to be in the film. The girl band from Sydney are called the Girlband.

Soundtrack

The music is composed by Shankar–Ehsaan–Loy and lyrics are penned by Sameer.

Reception
The album received favourable reviews from major critics. Joginder Tuteja of Bollywood Hungama in his four-star review, said that the album is a "must-buy": "The music score of Heyy Babyy is undoubtedly the best soundtrack of the year so far. Every track is a gem in its own way." Sukanya Verma of Rediff described the album as "a peppy soundtrack".

The album made its debut at No. 6 in the charts, later climbed up to the top 5 and remained consistent in the middle of the charts. According to the Indian trade website Box Office India, with around 12,00,000 units sold, this film's soundtrack album was the year's tenth highest-selling.

Reception

Reviews
Heyy Babyy opened to positive reviews, though many criticised the slow pace in the second half.

Taran Adarsh gave the film 4 out of 5 stars saying it "is an entertainer that has something for everyone". He praised the performances of the lead stars. Critic Aparajita Ghosh gave 3 out 5 stars, saying "Heyy Babyy packs in enough masala and emotion to keep you entertained throughout its running time." Noyon Jyoti Parasara of AOL India stated "Sajid Khan's debut is one movie you can go and watch and leave your brains behind. Go laugh aloud!"

Box office
Heyy Babyy opened to packed houses in over 650 cinemas in India. The opening was at 90%+ and continued to do well in the days following. It grossed  in India, $1.4 million in the US and £763,000 in the UK and was declared a "super-hit".

It was a hit abroad, opening to a favorable response and taking the second biggest Hindi film opening in the UK after Salaam-e-Ishq: A Tribute to Love (2007). Heyy Babyy debuted at number 10 and made £289,761 at a screen average of £4,765.

See also
 Trois hommes et un couffin or Three Men and a Cradle, 1985 French original

References

External links
 

2007 films
2000s buddy comedy films
Indian buddy comedy films
Films set in Sydney
2000s Hindi-language films
Hindi remakes of Malayalam films
Films shot in Brisbane
Indian remakes of French films
2007 directorial debut films
Films directed by Sajid Khan (director)
2007 comedy films